Collix haploscelis is a moth in the  family Geometridae. It is found on New Hanover Island.

References

Moths described in 1925
haploscelis